Gitta Connemann (born 10 May 1964) is a German lawyer and politician of the Christian Democratic Union (CDU) who has been serving as a member of the German Parliament since 2002. Since 2021, she has been serving as the chairwoman of MIT, the pro-business wing in the CDU/CSU.

Early life and career
Born to a Dutch mother and a German father, Connemann grew up on a farm. From 1984 until 1990, she studied law at the University of Osnabrück and the Johannes Gutenberg University of Mainz. She worked at a law firm in Darmstadt from 1993 to 1995. She later practiced as an independent lawyer with her own firm, Rickes Connemann, in Leer.

Political career
Connemann has been serving as a member of the German Bundestag since the 2002 elections, succeeding Rudolf Seiters. She represents Unterems. Between 2005 and 2013, she served on the Committee on Labor and Social Affairs, where she was her parliamentary group's rapporteur on labor law. She was also a member of the Committee on Cultural Affairs and Media (2005-2009). From 2014 until 2015, she chaired the Committee on Food and Agriculture. Since 2015, she has been serving as deputy chairperson of the CDU/CSU parliamentary group, under the leadership of successive chairs Volker Kauder (2015–2018) and Ralph Brinkhaus (2018–present).

In addition to her committee assignments, Connemann has been serving as deputy chairwoman of the German-Israeli Parliamentary Friendship Group since 2005.

In the negotiations to form a coalition government under the leadership of Chancellor Angela Merkel following the 2017 federal elections, Connemann was part of the working group on municipalities and rural areas, led by Reiner Haseloff, Kurt Gribl and Michael Groschek.

In 2021, Connemann announced her candidacy to succeed Carsten Linnemann as chair of MIT, the pro-business wing in the CDU/CSU; she won over Thomas Jarzombek.

Other activities
 German Foundation for Active Citizenship and Volunteering (DSEE), Member of the Board of Trustees (since 2020)
 International Youth Meeting Center in Oświęcim/Auschwitz, Member of the Board of Trustees
 American Jewish Committee, Lawrence & Lee Ramer Institute for German-Jewish Relations, Member of the Advisory Board
 Initiative Deutsche Sprache, Chairwoman of the Board of Trustees (2007-2008)
 Association of German Musical Societies (BVMV), Vice-President (2002-2005)
 Kreiskrankenhaus Leer, Deputy Member of the Supervisory Board (2002-2005)

Political positions
Under the umbrella of the godparenthood program of human rights organization IGMF for political prisoners, Connemann has been raising awareness for the activities of Cuban political dissident Marta Beatriz Roque since 2014.

Connemann was one of only five CDU parliamentarians who voted against the government's draft law on introducing a national minimum wage for the first time in Germany's history in July 2014.

In April 2020, Connemann co-signed – alongside around 50 other members of her parliamentary group – a letter to President of the European Commission Ursula von der Leyen which called on the European Union to take in children who were living in migrant camps across Greece.

Personal life
Connemann married fellow CDU politician Gerd Dählmann in Holtland in August 2015. The ceremony's guests included David McAllister and Julia Klöckner''.

References

External links 
  
 Bundestag biography

External links

1964 births
Living people
People from Leer
German Lutherans
East Frisians
Johannes Gutenberg University Mainz alumni
Members of the Bundestag for Lower Saxony
Female members of the Bundestag
21st-century German women politicians
Members of the Bundestag 2021–2025
Members of the Bundestag 2017–2021
Members of the Bundestag 2013–2017
Members of the Bundestag 2009–2013
Members of the Bundestag 2005–2009
Members of the Bundestag 2002–2005
Members of the Bundestag for the Christian Democratic Union of Germany